Piscola Creek is a stream in the U.S. state of Georgia.

Piscola is a name derived from the Creek language meaning "oil of the white oak acorns".

References

Rivers of Georgia (U.S. state)
Rivers of Brooks County, Georgia
Rivers of Thomas County, Georgia